Edward "Eddie" George Dowdall ( – ) was a Welsh rugby union, and professional rugby league footballer who played in the 1920s and 1930s.

Background
Eddie Dowdall's birth was registered in Newport district, Wales, and his death aged 66 was registered in Newport district, Wales.

Playing career

Notable tour matches
Eddie Dowdall played in Newport RFC's 10–13 defeat by New Zealand (RU) during the 1924–25 New Zealand rugby union tour of Britain, Ireland and France at Rodney Parade, Newport, Wales on Thursday 2 October 1924, and played in the 0–0 draw with New Zealand Māori (RU) during the 1926–27 New Zealand Māori rugby union tour at Rodney Parade, Newport, Wales on Thursday 21 October 1926.

Club career

Genealogical information
Eddie Dowdall's marriage to Ada E. (née Newman) was registered during second ¼ 1929 in Prescot district. Eddie Dowdall was "possibly" the nephew of the rugby union fullback of the 1880s for Newport RFC, Fred Dowdall.

References

External links
Statistics at blackandambers.co.uk
Search for "Dowdall " at rugbyleagueproject.org
Statistics at wigan.rlfans.com
Saints Heritage Society profile

1905 births
1968 deaths
Newport RFC players
Rugby league five-eighths
Rugby league halfbacks
Rugby league players from Newport, Wales
Rugby union scrum-halves
Rugby union players from Newport, Wales
St Helens R.F.C. players
Welsh rugby league players
Welsh rugby union players
Wigan Warriors players